Torrent Group is an Indian multinational conglomerate, based in Ahmedabad. It was founded by Uttambhai Nathalal Mehta, and now run by his sons, Sudhir and Samir Mehta. The core businesses of the group are gas, pharmaceuticals and power.

Subsidiaries 
The various companies under the Torrent banner are:

 Torrent Pharmaceuticals – One of the largest pharmaceutical companies of India. It has four manufacturing plants: (a) Chhatral, Gujarat and (b) Baddi, Himachal Pradesh c) Gangtok Sikkim and d) Dahej, Gujarat.TPL has Research Centre at bhat, Near Ahmedabad in Gujarat.
 Torrent Power – Responsible for generation, transmission and distribution of power to the cities of Ahmedabad and Surat. The company has taken up distribution of electricity in Bhiwandi Maharashtra, Agra and Kanpur Uttar Pradesh.
 Torrent Cables- Torrent cables was taken over from ailing Mahindra Electricals and revamped. It manufactures up to 132KV XLPE cables.
 Torrent Gas – Torrent Group has now forayed into City Gas Distribution business in different parts of India. Torrent Gas has its presence in 16 Geographical Areas spread across 32 districts covering 7 States and 1 UT in India.

Charity
In 2020, the company has contributed a total of 100cr to PM fund to fight against coronavirus pandemic.

Notes

References

External links
 

Companies based in Ahmedabad
Torrent Group
Indian companies established in 1959
1959 establishments in Bombay State